Robert Francis Harper (May 19, 1951 – January 23, 2020) was an American stage, film, and television actor.

Early life 
Raised in Middletown Township, New Jersey, he attended Mater Dei High School. He graduated with honors from Rutgers University with a degree in English literature.

Career 
Following his college graduation, Harper took a job at Arena Stage, where he performed in plays by Shakespeare, Ibsen, Miller, and Wilder.

He appeared on Broadway in a revival of Once in a Lifetime (directed by Tom Moore), The Inspector General, and the original cast of Arthur Miller's The American Clock. 

Harper was perhaps most well known for his role as Sharkey in Once Upon a Time in America. He also portrayed Charlie Gereson in Creepshow. Other film credits include Wiseguy, Final Analysis, The Insider, Deconstructing Harry, and Molly. 

Harper played lawyers on several occasions and said he had an interest in the law. Harper played Bubba Weisberger on the 1987 – 1988 sitcom Frank's Place. Harper's immersion into the character included spending a month at Tulane University Law School, carrying a novel by Southern writer Walker Percy while on the set, and reading short stories by Tennessee Williams. A Chicago Tribune review called Harper " a slow-moving joy to behold as the seersucker-rumpled lawyer". 

In May 2007, Harper delivered the Commencement Address at University College, Rutgers.

Personal life and death 
On May 30, 1981, he married Lisa Pelikan, an actress.

He was later married to a Dutch woman, Sascha Noorthoorn van der Kruyff, and died in Rotterdam.

Filmography

Television

References

External links

1951 births
2020 deaths
American male film actors
Place of death missing
American male stage actors
American male television actors
American expatriates in the Netherlands
Male actors from New Jersey
Male actors from New York City
Mater Dei High School (New Jersey) alumni
People from Middletown Township, New Jersey
Rutgers University alumni